The Avonmouth Bridge is a road bridge that carries the M5 motorway over the River Avon into Somerset near Bristol, England. It also has a separate footpath and cycleway which connects the B4054 near Avonmouth station with the Royal Portbury Dock and the village of Pill.

Construction
The bridge was built with three lanes each way, with full hard shoulders. In 1995–2000, it was widened to four lanes each way, with the result that the hard shoulders are no longer of full width.

The bridge was built to allow tall ships underneath. This gave the bridge steep gradients that cause heavy vehicles to slow down, resulting in congestion during rush hour and the summer tourist season: traffic can back up both on the bridge and on the approaches.

The construction contract was let to Fairfield-Mabey and commenced in 1969; Fairfield-Mabey placed a sub-contract with Tarmac Civil Engineering for the foundations, piers and deck concreting works.

Surface
The approach and initial climb up the bridge have a smooth asphalt surface; however, on the top of the bridge the surface was  uneven and bumpy when it was built. In September 2006, it was announced that the entire bridge would be resurfaced, only five years after the last resurfacing. This was completed in November 2009 by the construction firm Stirling Lloyd. However, the surfacing was carried out by Stirling Lloyd's partners Aeschlimann AG from Switzerland using its own workforce and importing all the plant used. A new type of asphalt called Gussasphalt was used on the bridge deck, The project was managed by Stirling Lloyd's Darren Holmes. In addition to having a smooth, skid-resistant finish, it requires no compaction and can be applied in very thin layers ( Each layer only 25 mm thick), thus reducing the weight added to the bridge. It is also flexible and as a result should last longer than the previous resurfacing.

References

External links

The Motorway Archive - M5 Junction 18 to 19

Bridges completed in 1974
Bridges in Bristol
Motorway bridges in England
Bridges in Somerset
Bridge
M5 motorway
Bridges across the River Avon, Bristol